Wadsworth is a hamlet and census-designated place (CDP) in the town of York, Livingston County, New York, United States. Its population was 190 as of the 2010 census. New York State Route 36 passes through the community.

Geography
Wadsworth is in northwestern Livingston County, in the southern part of the town of York. It is bordered to the north by the hamlet of Greigsville. NY 36, Wadsworth's Main Street, leads north through Greigsville  to the hamlet of York and south the same distance to Leicester.

The area around Wadsworth drains south to Beards Creek, an eastward-flowing tributary of the Genesee River.

Demographics

References

Hamlets in Livingston County, New York
Hamlets in New York (state)
Census-designated places in Livingston County, New York
Census-designated places in New York (state)